Pod Save America is an American progressive political podcast produced and distributed by Crooked Media. The podcast debuted in January 2017 and airs twice weekly, with the Tuesday edition hosted by former Barack Obama staffers Jon Favreau, Tommy Vietor, and Jon Lovett, and the Thursday edition by Favreau and Dan Pfeiffer.

It is the flagship podcast of Crooked Media, a media company founded by Favreau, Vietor, and Lovett. The show averages more than 1.5 million listeners an episode, and has been downloaded more than 120 million times as of November 2017.

Four Pod Save America one-hour HBO TV specials aired in fall 2018 to cover the U.S. midterm elections. Crooked Media also films the podcasts and releases them on their YouTube channel.

History
The podcast debuted in January 2017 as a successor to Keepin' it 1600, a political podcast produced by Bill Simmons' The Ringer and hosted by Favreau, Vietor, Lovett, and Pfeiffer which ran from March to December 2016. Pod Save America maintained the basic format of its predecessor.

In an interview with Recode's Kara Swisher, the hosts have stated that, rather than continue the previous podcast, the election of Donald Trump as President of the United States spurred them to create a progressive media company with a network of podcasts. Their goal is to inform their millions of fans and viewers that trust them as a reliable source.

Tour 
Crooked Media took the podcast on its first live tour, Pod Tours America, in the fall of 2017. Live shows were recorded and released as podcasts. An international tour, Pod Tours the World, was announced for 2018, with live shows in Stockholm, Oslo, Amsterdam, and London.

Content
The podcast typically covers recent news items relating to politics, including the Trump administration, the US government and the Democratic Party, as well as progressive grassroots activism.

The show typically features interviews with politicians, activists and journalists, including Obama's last interview as president. Other guests have included president Joe Biden, former secretary of state Hillary Clinton and senators Bernie Sanders, Elizabeth Warren, Cory Booker, Kamala Harris, and Chris Murphy. They have interviewed several former 2020 Democratic presidential candidates, including Sanders, Booker, Harris, Beto O'Rourke, Andrew Yang, Pete Buttigieg, Marianne Williamson, and Amy Klobuchar. Guests are often referred to as "friends of the pod".

Reception 
The show averages more than 1.5 million listeners an episode, and had been downloaded more than 120 million times by November 2017.

The New York Times described the podcast as "one of the big breakout hits of the nascent resistance movement", and "the left's answer to conservative talk radio... with a shoestring budget and no organizational backing, its hosts seem to have created something that liberals have spent almost two decades, and hundreds of millions of dollars, futilely searching for".

The San Francisco Chronicle called it "one of the nation's most popular podcasts". GQ called it one of the "most popular strategies for coping with the looming death of the republic".

Newsweek wrote that the show's hosts "do something far more rare [than political analysis], which is to make politics entertaining and even fun, without ever downplaying what they see as the threat posed to American democracy by the man elected to defend it."

See also
 Pod Save the World
Political podcast

References

External links 
 

2017 podcast debuts
Audio podcasts
Political podcasts
Crooked Media
American podcasts
Liberal podcasts